Gotham Central is a police procedural comic-book series that was published by DC Comics. It was written by Ed Brubaker and Greg Rucka, with pencils initially by Michael Lark. The story focused on the Gotham City Police Department and the difficulties of its officers living and working in Gotham City, home of Batman.

Publication history

Formation
Greg Rucka and Ed Brubaker collaborated on the "Officer Down" Batman crossover. They wanted to do a series about the police in Gotham City and finally obtained approval from DC executives. The writers wanted Michael Lark for pencils and waited nearly a year to get him onboard due to scheduling, but used the opportunity to plan out the storylines. They plotted out the new series' elements and decided to script the first story arc together, then split the lengthy cast into two shifts: Rucka would write the GCPD's day shift storylines, Brubaker would take the night shift, and Lark would pencil them both. Gotham Central'''s debut yielded Eisner Award nominations in 2003 for Best New Series, Best Writer (Rucka), Best Writer (Brubaker), and Best Penciller/Inker (Lark).

Sales problemsGotham Central repeatedly failed to break the top 100 comics in sales. Despite this, DC Comics were encouraged by the improved sales of the trade paperback collected editions. In an interview, Ed Brubaker stated that the book sold pretty well and was never in danger of cancellation, outselling almost all of Vertigo's books at the time. Ultimately Lark and Brubaker moved on to other projects, and, after three years of publication, the series ended amid the Infinite Crisis aftermath. It continued to have sales troubles through to the conclusion: issue #37 ranked 102nd place, and issue #38 ranked 120th place on the distributor's charts.

End of the series
Despite the sales, writer Greg Rucka assured that DC would have continued publishing Gotham Central as long as he wanted to write it and that it was his decision to conclude the series. Rucka felt that the book was a co-creation between himself, Lark and Brubaker and when they left, with issue #25 and #37 respectively, it was time to move on. The year long break provided by the Infinite Crisis event provided an opportune place to close out the main storylines. At one point, Rucka was in talks to replace Gotham Central with a new series called Streets of Gotham, which would focus on Renee Montoya as a private investigator. Those plans were scrapped in favor of making Montoya a major character in the weekly series 52, with Rucka as a co-writer. In 2009, DC released an unrelated series called Batman: Streets of Gotham that has been described as a mixture of Gotham Central and another canceled Batman series, Batman: Gotham Knights.

Cast of characters

The Gotham Central cast was divided between the day and night shifts, with arcs alternating between both sets of characters. Main characters among the ranks of the detectives were Marcus Driver, Romy Chandler, Renee Montoya, Crispus Allen and Josephine "Josie Mac" MacDonald. Their superiors, Commissioner Michael Akins, Captain Margaret "Maggie" Sawyer and Lieutenant Ron Probson also appeared prominently. Jim Corrigan, a corrupt CSI, features near the end of the series.

The supporting cast was mainly pulled from the large roster of the Gotham City Police Department and some characters were subjects of their own story arcs. Long-time supporting characters of Batman, James Gordon and Harvey Bullock, also made recurring appearances. Batman himself, although not often seen, played a prominent role in the series.

Stories/story arcs

Characters after the series' end
 Michael Akins left the force under unknown circumstances during the one-year gap with James Gordon taking back the role of Police Commissioner. It is implied that Akins had either become corrupt himself, or had done nothing to curb corruption in the GCPD.
 The deceased Allen became the Spectre during the events of Infinite Crisis. He was briefly turned into a Black Lantern before regaining the Spectre mantle. 
 Renee Montoya became one of the major characters in 52, a series dealing with the aftermath of Infinite Crisis. During the series she takes up the guise of the Question.
 Josie Mac and Maggie Sawyer have also appeared in minor roles in 52 and both have made sporadic appearances in Batman-related comic books, with Sawyer eventually becoming a prominent member of Kate Kane's supporting cast. Sawyer and Kane are currently engaged to be married.
 Marcus Driver and Josh Azeveda appeared in the miniseries Tales of the Unexpected, along with the Spectre (Crispus Allen). Romy Chandler and Stacy also made brief cameos.
 Harvey Bullock is hired back onto the force under disciplinary probation during the "one-year gap"—the exact reasons are never expressly stated—with the understanding that he is not allowed to make a single mistake. He and Batman have set a "clean slate" for their new working relationship (see Batman: Face the Face).

Awards
 
 Eisner Awards – Best Serialized Story 2004 – Half a Life (Gotham Central #6–10).
 Harvey Awards – Best Single Issue or Story 2004 – Half a Life (Gotham Central #6–10). Tied with Love & Rockets #9.
 Gaylactic Spectrum Awards – Best Other Work 2004 – Half a Life (Gotham Central #6–10). Tied with Angels in America.

Collected editions

Television series
In August 2006, Brubaker said that he was told that many people at Warner Bros. loved the comic, and that if they had not had a moratorium on Batman television shows, they "could have set up Gotham Central at WB in a heartbeat".

A television series titled Gotham was in development by Fox in 2013, following the career of Jim Gordon prior to the appearance of Batman. The series premise bears similarities to Gotham Central. It premiered on September 22, 2014. To coincide with Gothams premiere, DC Comics issued a reprint of Gotham Central #1, at a special price of $1.http://www.comicvine.com/gotham-central-special-edition-1-in-the-line-of-du/4000-465825/ 

An untitled police procedural TV series from Matt Reeves was in development, to be set in the same continuity as the film The Batman. Gotham Central was being considered as a title for the series. The development of the show was revealed to not being moving forward and put on hold in March 2022.

See also
 Batman
 Gotham City Police Department
 Batman: GCPD, a comic book series similar in theme to Gotham Central''.

References

External links
 

 Editorial on Gotham Central at Indian Comic Review
 Gotham Central at TheBatSquad.net

2002 comics debuts
2006 comics endings
Crime comics
Gotham City Police Department
Eisner Award winners
Harvey Award winners for Best Single Issue or Story
Comics by Ed Brubaker
Comics by Greg Rucka